The season 2008/09 was the sixth year under the title Elite One Championship the top level rugby league competition in France. The season ran from October to May. Ten clubs competed for the title playing 20 rounds in the league before the top five progressed to the end of season play-offs. UTC who had finished 5th were not allowed to take their place in the play-offs, their place was given to Carpentras. Pia XIII were beaten by Lézignan Sangliers in a repeat of the previous two finals, and AS Carcassonne knocked out RC Carpentras XIII. At the second stage Lezignan shocked league leaders Limoux Grizzlies 20-18 away to reach the final in the other game AS Carcassonne eliminated Pia. In the elimination final Limoux thrashed AS Carcassonne 41-16. The final was held at Carcassonne's Stade Albert Domec and defending champions Lézignan Sangliers beat Limoux Grizzlies 40-32. At the other end of the table Lyon Villeurbanne XIII were relegated. In the Lord Derby cup final AS Carcassonne beat Limoux Grizzlies to complete a winless campaign for Limoux.

Table 

Points :win=3 :draw=2 :loss=1:

Play-offs 
Week 1
 Quarter-Final - AS Carcassonne 62-4 RC Carpentras XIII
 Quarter-Final - Pia XIII 12-50 Lézignan Sangliers
Week 2
 Elimination Semi-Final - AS Carcassonne 25-18 Pia XIII
 Major Semi-Final - Limoux Grizzlies 18-20 Lézignan Sangliers
Week 3
 Preliminary Final - Limoux Grizzlies 41-16 AS Carcassonne

Grand Final

External links
  Rankings on itsrugby.fr

Rugby league competitions in France
2008 in French rugby league
2009 in French rugby league